Nanjing University Xianlin Campus station, is a station of Line 2 of the Nanjing Metro. It started operations on 28 May 2010 along with the rest of Line 2. The station is decorated with an International Workers' Day theme.

References

Railway stations in Jiangsu
Railway stations in China opened in 2010
Nanjing Metro stations
Railway stations in China at university and college campuses